Richard Andrews was a Texian merchant and soldier who was the first killed in action casualty of the Texas Revolution during the Battle of Concepción on October 28, 1835. He is a folk hero (the "Nathan Hale of Texas") for his purported final words "I am a dead man, but don't let the other boys know it. Tell them to conquer or die."

He is purportedly also the first wounded in action casualty of the war at the Battle of Gonzales on October 2, 1835. However, Samuel McCulloch Jr. is considered by some historians to be the first at the Battle of Goliad on October 10, 1835.

Biography

Andrews, an Indian fighter, joined the Texian army at the beginning of the Texas Revolution. Andrews was nicknamed "Big Dick" because of his large size and great strength. He was wounded in the Battle of Gonzales on October 2, 1835. He fought at the Battle of Concepción on October 28, 1835, where he was the only Texian killed in the battle. His purported final words were "I am a dead man, but don't let the other boys know it. Tell them to conquer or die."

A memorial to Captain Andrews was erected by the State of Texas and stands approximately .15 miles west of Mission Road on E. Theo Avenue near Concepcion Park, in San Antonio, Texas.

Legacy

Monuments 

 "The First Sacrifice in the War of Texas Independence", 1936 Texas Centennial Monument, San Antonio Missions National Historical Park.

It reads:

Erected by the State of Texas to Commemorate the Heroic Deeds of Captain Richard Andrews.

Born in Sandersville, Georgia in 1800. Fell at the Battle of Concepcion October 28, 1835. The first sacrifice in the War of Texas Independence. Son of William and Mary Andrews. Came to Texas in 1818. Established an Indian Trading Post on the Brazos River at the present site of Richmond. Later moved to Mina, now Bastrop. Was an Indian fighter of note. A scout of indomitable courage. One of the first to enlist in the War for Texas Independence  and the first to die for his country.

Namesakes 

 Andrews County
 Andrews, Texas

See also
Samuel McCulloch Jr.
Come and take it
Battle of Concepcion
Siege of Bexar
Texas Revolution

References

Sources
History of Fort Bend County, Clarence Wharton, 1939.

External links

1835 deaths
People of the Texas Revolution
Military personnel killed in action
1800 births
Military personnel from Georgia (U.S. state)